Merrily We Roll Along is a play by George S. Kaufman and Moss Hart.  It concerns a man who has lost the idealistic values of his youth.  Its innovative structure presents the story in reverse order, with the character regressing from a mournful adult to a young man whose future is filled with promise.

The 1934 Broadway production received mostly good notices but was a financial failure and has not been revived on Broadway. The 1981 musical adaptation was initially a failure but has subsequently been more successful, having been revived several times.

Synopsis
Richard Niles is a pretentious 40-year-old playwright who writes successful but forgettable frothy comedies. Niles is hosting a party for his wealthy friends at his Long Island home on the opening night of his newest play. His life is empty, petty and loveless. The story moves backward in nine scenes from 1934 to 1916, as Niles achieves success by gradually compromising his integrity and principles. He drives his friend, the novelist Julia Glenn (patterned after Dorothy Parker), to drink; loses his best friend, painter Jonathan Crale; and betrays his wife, the glamorous actress Althea Royce, simply to gain material comfort and satisfy his ambition. In the final scene, Niles, on graduation day at his college, idealistically quotes the words of Polonius: "This above all, to thine own self be true."

Background and production history
On a journey from Hollywood to New York in 1931, Hart was inspired to write a play about an American family's difficulty over 30 years coping with the challenges of life in the 20th century, beginning with their innocence and optimism at the century's start to the dashed hopes caused by the stock market crash of 1929. But before he could realize his vision, Noël Coward's British version of a similar story, Cavalcade, premiered, and he shelved the idea. A few years later, Hart turned to Kaufman, his collaborator on the 1930 hit Once in a Lifetime. The idea had now evolved to tell a story backward about an idealistic but ambitious playwright and his difficulties.

The Broadway production, directed by Kaufman, opened on September 29, 1934, at the Music Box Theatre, where it ran for 155 performances. The 55-member cast included Kenneth MacKenna as Richard Niles, Walter Abel as Jonathan Crale, Jessie Royce Landis as Althea Royce, and Mary Philips as Julia Glenn.

The play has not been revived on Broadway, and its tour following the Broadway production was short.

Critical response
Critic Brooks Atkinson of The New York Times wrote: "After this declaration of ethics, it will be impossible to dismiss Mr. Kaufman and Mr. Hart as clever jesters with an instinct for the stage." Time wrote, "Superbly staged...; superbly acted by the biggest cast seen in a legitimate Broadway production this season, Merrily We Roll Along is an amusing and affecting study...."

Despite good notices, the play was not a financial success, as the demands of the large-scale production made it expensive. 
In retrospect, the Times has noted that the play suffers from a "Depression sensibility. The notion that you can't get ahead without selling out is one that held particular appeal.... There was something both morally and politically suspect about worldly fortune at a time when, as Franklin D. Roosevelt said in his 1937 inaugural address, one-third of the nation was 'ill housed, ill clad, ill nourished.'"

Adaptations
In 1981, the play was loosely adapted as a musical of the same name with a book by George Furth and lyrics and music by Stephen Sondheim. While the original Broadway production was a notorious failure, the musical has since been successfully staged with numerous changes. Sondheim contributed new songs to several of the show's incarnations.

References

External links

 
1934 production at Internet Broadway Database
At This Theatre: Music Box Theatre

1934 plays
Broadway plays
Plays by Moss Hart
Plays by George S. Kaufman
Plays set in New York City